Patrick Joseph Hooper (died 6 September 1931) was an Irish politician, barrister and journalist. In 1915 was called to the English and Welsh bar by Gray's Inn. Hooper was the last editor of the Freeman's Journal. Imprisoned for a month in 1920 along with Fitzgerald and Edwards, for publishing an article about British Army/Black and Tans brutality. He was an independent member of Seanad Éireann from 1927 to 1931. A journalist, he was elected at a by-election on 23 March 1927 taking the seat vacated by the death of Martin Fitzgerald. He was Leas-Chathaoirleach of the Seanad from 6 May 1931 until his death in September 1931. George Crosbie was elected at a by-election to replace him.

His father John Hooper was also a politician and journalist and is referred to in Ulysses by James Joyce.

References

Year of birth missing
1931 deaths
Independent members of Seanad Éireann
Members of the 1925 Seanad
Members of the 1928 Seanad
Politicians from Dublin (city)
Journalists from Dublin (city)